Kenty Creek is a stream in the U.S. state of Mississippi.  It is a tributary to Lobutcha Creek.

Kenty is a name derived from the Choctaw language meaning "beaver".

References

Rivers of Mississippi
Rivers of Attala County, Mississippi
Rivers of Leake County, Mississippi
Mississippi placenames of Native American origin